Cealasaigh or Kealasay is an islet in outer Loch Ròg, Lewis, Scotland that lies north of Traigh Mhór on Little Bernera and south of Campaigh.

To the west is the islet of Eilean Fir Chrothair (isle of the shepherd) and Sgeir na h-Aon Chaorach (lone sheep rock) lies to the east.

Notes 

Islands of Loch Ròg